Rizwan Ali (born 17 August 1999) is a Pakistani cricketer. He made his first-class debut for Islamabad in the 2018–19 Quaid-e-Azam Trophy on 16 September 2018.

References

External links
 

1999 births
Living people
Pakistani cricketers
Islamabad cricketers